The Journal of the Royal Astronomical Society of Canada is a bimonthly peer-reviewed scientific journal published by the Royal Astronomical Society of Canada since 1907. The title in French is Journal de la Société royale d'astronomie du Canada. 

The founding editor was Clarence Chant. The journal was preceded by the Transactions of the Astronomical and Physical Society of Toronto (1890–1901), followed by the Royal Astronomical Society of Canada Selected Papers and Proceedings (1902–1903) and the Royal Astronomical Society of Canada Transactions (1904–1905).

The Astrophysics Data System contains issues older than one year back to the journal's foundation.

References

External links 
 
 Online access to predecessor journals (1890-1905)

Multilingual journals
Astronomy journals
Publications established in 1907
Bimonthly journals
Academic journals published by learned and professional societies of Canada